Hugh Doherty (1903 – 13 October 1972) was an Irish Fianna Fáil politician. He was an unsuccessful candidate for the Donegal constituency at the 1932 general election, but was elected to Dáil Éireann as a Fianna Fáil Teachta Dála (TD) for same constituency at the 1933 general election. He did not contest the 1937 general election.

References

1903 births
1972 deaths
Fianna Fáil TDs
Members of the 8th Dáil
Politicians from County Donegal